Harold Adair Nisbet (22 June 1873 – 12 March 1937) was a British lawn tennis player who was active at the end of the 19th century and beginning of the 20th century.

During his career he reached four doubles finals at the Wimbledon Championships (1896, 1898, 1899, 1900) as well as the doubles final at the U.S. National Championships in 1897. In singles, Nisbet reached the all-comers final of the U.S. National Championships in 1897 (losing to Wilberforce Eaves) and the semifinals of Wimbledon in 1896 (losing in five sets to Harold Mahony) and 1900 (losing to Sydney Smith in straight sets).

Grand Slam finals

Singles (1 final)

All-Comers

Doubles (5 runner-ups)

References

19th-century English people
19th-century male tennis players
1873 births
1937 deaths
English male tennis players
British male tennis players
Tennis people from Greater London